Steffi Graf defeated Helena Suková in the final, 6–3, 6–3 to win the women's singles tennis title at the 1993 US Open. It was her third US Open title. This marked Suková's fourth and final appearance in a major final, finishing runner-up each time. With the win, Graf became the first player (male or female) to achieve a second Surface Slam. This was also the first time that both finalists were from Europe.

Monica Seles was the two-time reigning champion, but was unable to participate due to her on-court stabbing in April 1993.

Seeds
The seeded players are listed below. Steffi Graf is the champion; others show the round in which they were eliminated.

  Steffi Graf (champion)
  Arantxa Sánchez Vicario (semifinalist)
  Martina Navratilova (fourth round)
  Conchita Martínez (fourth round)
  Gabriela Sabatini (quarterfinalist)
  Mary Joe Fernández (withdrew)
  Jennifer Capriati (first round)
  Jana Novotná (fourth round)
  Anke Huber (third round)
  Magdalena Maleeva (fourth round)
  Manuela Maleeva (semifinalist)
  Helena Suková (finalist)
  Mary Pierce (fourth round)
  Nathalie Tauziat (fourth round)
  Amanda Coetzer (third round)
  Zina Garrison (third round)

Qualifying

Draw

Finals

Top half

Section 1

Section 2

Section 3

Section 4

Bottom half

Section 5

Section 6

Section 7

Section 8

External links
1993 US Open – Women's draws and results at the International Tennis Federation

Women's Singles
US Open (tennis) by year – Women's singles
1993 in women's tennis
1993 in American women's sports